Bedfordia linearis is a species of flowering plant in the genus Bedfordia. This species is accepted. This species is common amongst dry forests and is classified as a shrub. The leaves it grows varies from different sizes, from forms that vary from 1cm - flat 10cm. This species is endemic to Tasmania.

References

Senecioneae
Asterales of Australia
Flora of Tasmania